Govindapura (Sanskrit) and its derivation in the various languages may refer to:

 Govindpura, Bangalore, a neighborhood in Bangalore
 Govindpura, Bhopal
 Gobindpur, Jharkhand
 Gobindapur, Kolkata 
 Govindpur, Prayag
 Govindpur, Madhya Pradesh a place near Gwalior, Madhya Pradesh 
 Govindpura, Pakistan
 Govindapuram, Kozhikode, Kerala, 
 Govindapuram, Andhra Pradesh 
 Govindapuram, Palakkad, Kerala
 Govindapuram, Ariyalur, Tamil Nadu
 Govindapuram, Thanjavur district
 Govindpura, Pakistan

See also
 Govindpur (disambiguation)
 Govindapur (disambiguation)
 Gobindapur (disambiguation)
 Gobindpur (disambiguation)